The UK Albums Chart is a weekly record chart based on album sales from Friday to Thursday in the United Kingdom; , there had been 266 number-one albums during the 2010s, by 76 artists. The Official Charts Company (OCC) defines an "album" as being a type of music release that feature more than four tracks and last longer than 25 minutes; sales of albums in the UK are recorded on behalf of the British music industry by the OCC and compiled weekly as the UK Albums Chart.

The chart is based on both physical and digital album sales, as well as audio streaming, and each week's new number one is first announced every Friday (previously Sunday) on The Official Chart on BBC Radio 1, which is currently hosted by Scott Mills. The album chart is published online by Radio 1 (Top 40), in Music Week magazine (Top 75), on the OCC website (Top 100) and the full Top 200 is published exclusively in UKChartsPlus. In June 2010, Time Flies... 1994–2009 by Oasis became the 900th album ever to top the UK Albums Chart, in November 2013, Swings Both Ways by Robbie Williams became the 1,000th, and in November 2016, 24 Hrs by Olly Murs became the 1,100th.

The following albums were all number one in the United Kingdom during the 2010s.

Number-one albums

Artists with the most number ones in the 2010s
Eighteen different artists had three number ones on the UK Albums Chart during the 2010s, whilst eight artists have had four number ones. In 2012, Rihanna became the first artist to have three albums reach number one: Loud, which spent three weeks at number one; Talk That Talk, which spent two weeks at number one, and Unapologetic, which spent one week at number one. One Direction gained their fourth UK number-one album in 2015, followed by Robbie Williams and Olly Murs in 2016. Eminem, Lady Gaga, Ed Sheeran, Taylor Swift, Lana Del Rey and Coldplay later scored their fourth chart-toppers of the decade as well. In December 2019, Williams' album The Christmas Present claimed the number 1 spot, making him the first artist of the decade to have five number-one albums and the artist with the most-chart topping albums for the second consecutive decade.

  Originally released in the 2000s, but went to number one during the 2010s.

Albums with the most weeks at number one
The following albums spent at least seven weeks at number one during the 2010s.

Artists with the most weeks at number one
Twenty different artists have spent five weeks or more at number one on the album chart so far during the 2010s. Ed Sheeran has spent the most weeks at number one, with a total of 41 weeks.

By record label
Thirteen different record labels have spent five weeks or more at number one on the album chart so far during the 2010s.

Christmas number ones

In the UK, Christmas number one albums are those that are at the top of the UK Albums Chart on Christmas Day. Typically, this will refer to the album that was announced as number one on the Sunday before 25 December—when Christmas Day falls on a Sunday itself, the official number one is considered by the OCC to be the one announced on that day's chart. During the 2010s, the following albums were Christmas number ones.

See also
 List of UK Album Downloads Chart number ones of the 2010s
 List of UK Compilation Chart number ones of the 2010s
 List of UK Singles Chart number ones of the 2010s

Notes

References

External links
Official Albums Chart Top 100 at the Official Charts Company
The Official UK Top 40 Albums Chart at BBC Radio 1

2010s in British music
United Kingdom Albums
2010s